Mark. H. Gelber (born 1951, Brooklyn, New York) is an American-Israeli scholar of comparative literature and German-Jewish literature and culture. He received his B.A. magna cum laude and with high honors in Letters and German (Phi Beta Kappa, Wesleyan University). He also studied at the University of Bonn, the University of Grenoble, and Tel Aviv University. He was accepted for graduate studies as a Lewis Farmington Fellow in the Humanities and Social Sciences at Yale University and he received his M.A., M.Phil., and Ph.D. from Yale University. In 1980 he accepted an appointment as post-doctoral lecturer at Ben-Gurion University of the Negev, Beer Sheva, in the Department of Foreign Literatures and Linguistics. Except for guest professorships and research fellowships abroad, he has been affiliated there since that time. His research topics include: German-Jewish literature and culture, the literature of exile, cultural Zionism, early Zionist literature and journalism, literary anti-Semitism, autobiography and biography, and literary reception. He lectures frequently at international meetings and conferences in Israel, Europe, China, and the United States. He is presently professor emeritus with active researcher status.

A Festschrift in honor of Gelber's retirement ("Emeritierung"), co-edited by Stefan Vogt, Hans Otto Horch, Malgorzata A. Maksymiak and Vivian Liska, was presented in 2018: Wegweiser und Grenzgänger:  Studien zur deutsch-jüdischen Kultur- und Literaturgeschichte. Eine Festschrift für Mark H. Gelber [Pathfinder on the Frontiers: Interdisciplinary Studies in German and German-Jewish Literary and Cultural History. Essays in Honor of Mark H. Gelber] (Böhlau Verlag). A symposium in honor of Gelber, entitled "Austrian/German-Jewish Studies and Their Future," was held at Ben-Gurion University in October, 2018. Also the Republic of Austria selected Mark Gelber to receive the prestigious Honorary Medal for Science and Art, First Class (Österreichisches Ehrenkreuz für Wissenschaft und Kunst, 1. Klasse).

Positions and Awards 
Gelber won Alexander von Humboldt Research Fellowships in 1991–92, 2003–04, and 2018–19 (Univ. Tübingen, Freie Universität, Berlin, Europa Univ. Viadrina, Frankfurt/Oder, Selma Stern Zentrum für Jüdische Studien, Berlin), in addition to several DAAD (German Academic Exchange Service) research stipends. He has been a guest professor at the University of Pennsylvania, a David Herzog visiting professor at the University of Graz, Austrian guest professor at the University of Maribor, Blaustein visiting professor at Yale University in Judaic Studies, honorary research fellow at the University of Auckland, guest professor of German literature at the Universiteit Antwerpen, DAAD-Gastprofessor at the RWTH Aachen, Taub Center guest professor at New York University, guest professor at Renmin University, Beijing, and guest professor at Sun Yat-sen University (Guangzhou). He was invited to be a member of the International Advisory Board of the Yearbook of the Leo Baeck Institute (London) and appointed to the wissenschaftliche Beirat of "Literaturstrasse," the Chinese-German Yearbook for Language, Literature and Cultural Studies.

From 2008-2018 Gelber directed the Research Center for Austrian and German Studies at Ben-Gurion University. He was a member of the executive board of the Rabb Center for Holocaust Studies from its founding at BGU until his retirement. He was elected twice as Chair of the Department of Foreign Literatures and Linguistics and was appointed Director of the Overseas Student Programs and the Center for International Student Programs at BGU (1996–2004). He established and directed the Internationale Sommeruniversität für Hebräisch, Jüdische Studien und Israelwissenschaften in Beer Sheva (1998–2004, 2009), which has hosted hundreds or more German-speaking students from a dozen countries since its inception. In November 2008 he was appointed Dean of International Academic Affairs at Ben-Gurion University. In 2009 he was elected to the executive board of the Leo Baeck Institute, Jerusalem, where he served from 2009–2017.

In 2001 Gelber was elected to life membership in the Deutsche Akademie für Sprache und Dichtung (Darmstadt). From 2007-2014 he served as the Israeli academic representative on the Post-doctoral Fellowship Committee for the Minerva Foundation of the Max Planck Gesellschaft (München) with primary responsibility for the faculties of the humanities, social sciences and law. He regularly reviews research projects for the German-Israel Fund (GIF) and the Austrian Science Foundation. He was appointed twice by Israeli Ministers of Education to be a judge for the Israel Prize in World Literature and in Hebrew and Jewish Literatures. 
 
Gelber also sits on the International Scientific Board of the Österreichische Exilbibliothek (Vienna) and the executive board of the Institute for Jewish Studies in Antwerp. He is a member of the editorial board of the prestigious conditio judaica book series on German-Jewish Literature and Culture, first published at Niemeyer Verlag (Tübingen) and now published by Verlag Walter de Gruyter (Berlin) and is a member of the editorial board of the series "Perspectives on Jewish Texts and Contexts," also published by de Gruyter. He is on the international editorial board of "transversal," published by the Center of Jewish Studies, University of Graz, as well as the international editorial board of “Chilufim,” published by the Center for Jewish Cultural History at the University of Salzburg. He was elected to serve on the academic committee of the Internationale Stefan Zweig Gesellschaft (Salzburg) and also elected to the Executive Board of the Association for European Jewish Literature Studies (EJLS).

Publications and Scholarly Activity 
Gelber has published 20 single-authored, edited, and co-edited books and about 100 scholarly essays (articles, book chapters) and an additional 75 shorter pieces (book reviews, encyclopedia articles, museum catalogue contributions, academic bulletin articles, academic eulogies, scholarly introductions). He is known for his wide range of subjects spanning the fields of literature, history, religion, and cultural studies. Also, he has given more than 250 lectures at academic conferences and seminars internationally. His topics include the following authors: Franz Kafka, Max Brod, Stefan Zweig, Joseph Roth, Elias Canetti, Martin Buber, Theodor Herzl, Nathan Birnbaum, Else Lasker-Schüler, Richard Beer-Hofmann, Max Nordau, E.M. Lilien, Thomas Mann, Gustav Freytag, Georg Hermann, Manfred Sturmann, Julius Bab, Nelly Sachs, Glückel von Hameln, Heinrich Heine, Ludwig Börne, Karl Emil Franzos, Charles Dickens, T.S. Eliot, Erica Jong, Elie Wiesel, Jakov Lind, Ruth Klüger, Rose Ausländer, and others. M.A. and doctoral students have written theses under his guidance on a wide range of topics, including: “The Tarot in Eliot, Yeats, and Kafka,” “Kafka’s Substitute Mothers,” “Franz Kafka’s Mystical Modalities,” “Martin Buber’s Theory of Art Education,” "In Defense of Fiction: Representations of Trauma in Shoah Literature," “Mapping Zionism: East and West in Early Zionist Thought,” “Jacques Derrida’s Double Torah,”  “Academic Autobiography, Freud and the Shoa: Peter Gay and Sara Kofman,” “Konzepte der Authentizität im frühen deutschen zionistischen Diskurs von 1862 bis ins 20. Jahrhundert, "Understanding and Judgement in 'The Grey Zone' in Primo Levi's Ethical Thought," and "Kafka's The Trial: A Reevaluation of Morality and a Critique of Jurisprudence." Gelber has functioned as host and mentor to numerous post-doctoral fellows sponsored by the Kreitman School at BGU, the Alexander von Humboldt Foundation, the Deutsche Forschungsgemeinschaft and the Minerva Foundation. His post-doctoral researchers have included:  Eitan Bar-Yosef, Amos Morris-Reich, Na’ama Rokem, Bettina von Jagow, Stefan Vogt and others.

Literary Anti-Semitism 
At the first international conference concerning literary anti-Semitism (Bielefeld, 2007) Gelber was called a pioneer in the field. It was the topic of his doctoral dissertation, “Aspects of Literary Anti-Semitism: Dickens and Freytag” (Yale: 1980). His foundational scholarly article, "What is Literary Anti-Semitism?" (1985) appeared in Jewish Social Studies (then published by Columbia University in New York). According to Gelber: "…any useful definition of literary anti-Semitism must proceed from literature itself, that is, from texts... literary anti-Semitism may be defined as the potential or capacity of a text to encourage or positively evaluate anti-Semitic attitudes or behaviors, in accordance, generally, with the delineation of such attitudes and behaviors by social scientists and historians. Just as social scientists are careful to locate and identify anti-Semitism according to indices of attitudes and behaviors, literary scholars must attempt to understand precisely how anti-Semitic attitudes manifest themselves in literature and how 'anti-Semitically charged elements' function and interact in texts." His other articles on literary (and filmic) anti-Semitism have focused on Charles Dickens, Gustav Freytag, Julius Langbehn, Houston Stewart Chamberlain, Thomas Mann, T.S. Eliot, Paul de Man, and Mel Gibson. In 2012 he organized a study day in Israel on the possible literary anti-Semitism and public controversy concerning Günter Grass's "Was gesagt werden muss."

Mark H. Gelber, "Literarischer Antisemitismus," in Hans Otto Horch (Ed.), "Handbuch der deutsch-jüdischen Literatur" (Oldenbourg: De Gruyter 2016), 37-44.

Cultural Zionism 
Gelber's book on Cultural Zionism and German Literature and Culture, entitled Melancholy Pride: Nation, Race, and Gender in the German Literature of Cultural Zionism (2000) illuminated the diverse and complicated reciprocal relationships between Jewish national expression and German literature and culture at the end of the 19th century. Numerous scholarly reviewers, including Ritchie Robertson (Oxford), Gerhard Kurz (Giessen) and Armin A. Wallas (Klagenfurt) were unanimous in their high praise this study.  Key figures such as Martin Buber, Nathan Birnbaum, E.M. Lilien, Lesser Ury, Berthold Feiwel, Adolph Donath, Richard Beer-Hofmann, Karl Wolfskehl, Else Lasker-Schüler, Börries Freiherr von Münchhausen and many others appear in this particular cultural and literary space.

Franz Kafka 
Gelber is recognized internationally as an expert on the writings and career of Franz Kafka, especially regarding his complex relationship to Zionism. He organized an international conference in 1999, entitled: “’Ich bin Ende oder Anfang’: Kafka, Zionism and Beyond.” The papers delivered at this conference were edited by him and published in 2004 (Niemeyer Verlag). He contributed an essay on Zionist interpretations of Kafka to the Kafka Handbuch (Vandenhoeck & Ruprecht, 2008). Gelber served as an expert consultant to the National Library of Israel in the protracted legal case concerning the will and literary estate of Max Brod, which includes numerous Kafka manuscripts. He was invited by various institutes and universities, such as Stanford University, New York University, Wesleyan University, the University of California, Davis, the University of Antwerp, RWTH Aachen, the Jewish Historical Museum in Amsterdam, New School for Social Research in New York, and others, to deliver lectures or to engage in dialogue or debate regarding Kafka and his work, his relationship to Zionism, and the trial in Israel. In 2015, Gelber co-organized an international conference at Ben-Gurion University in Beer Sheva entitled "Kafka after Kafka." "Kafka after Kafka. The co-edited conference volume (with Iris Bruce), Kafka after Kafka, Dialogical Encounters with His Works from the Holocaust to Postmodernism'(Camden House) was published in 2019."

Mark H. Gelber, 2019, "Die Araberfrage im Prager Kulturzionismus und der Orientalismus," in Chiara Adorisio und Camela Lorella Bosco (Eds.), Zwischen Orient und Europa (Tübingen: Narr Francke Attempo 2019), 197-208.

Mark H. Gelber 2019, "Kafka and Brod After the Trial and Judgements in Israel," in Iris Bruce and Mark H. Gelber (Eds.), Kafka after Kafka (Rochester: Camden House 2019), 79-97.

Mark H. Gelber 2019, "Amerikanismus, Jiddisch, Judentum und Interkulturalität," in Steffen Höhne und Manfred Weinberg (Eds.), Franz Kafka im interkulturellen Kontext" (Wien, Köln, Weimar: Böhlau, 2019), 87-96.

 Stefan Zweig 
Gelber is the author of numerous publications on the Austrian-Jewish writer Stefan Zweig, which have inaugurated a new way of reading Zweig, particularly within various Jewish and Zionist contexts. He has been called "one of the world's most eminent authorities on the works of the early 20th century Jewish-Austrian author Stefan Zweig" and the "Israeli Zweig expert". He organized the first Stefan Zweig conference held in Israel in 1981, and he was invited by the city of Salzburg to organize the first major international Stefan Zweig Congress (1992). He organized two more international Zweig conferences (Jerusalem-Beer Sheva, Berlin); he co-edited and published the papers from both of these conferences. In 2011, he gave the first biannual Stefan Zweig lecture at the State University of New York at Fredonia, the location of a major Stefan Zweig archive. Gelber has lectured on Zweig in Israel, Europe, the U.S. and Canada, in Brazil, China, New Zealand and elsewhere. In 2012, he delivered opening plenary lectures at two major international Zweig conferences: the University of London and Renmin University in Beijing. ' Gelber's monograph, 'Stefan Zweig, Judentum und Zionismus',' was published by Studien Verlag (Innsbruck: 2014). Gelber co-edited a volume of essays (with Birger Vanwesenbeeck), Stefan Zweig and World Literature: 21st Century Perspectives (Camden House: 2014). and (with Zhang Yi, Renmin University) the essay collection: Aktualität und Beliebtheit – Neue Forschung und Rezeption von Stefan Zweig im internationalen Blickwinkel (2015) The notion of an international renaissance in Zweig Studies is now being bruited and Gelber has made a significant contribution to it.   Gelber was the initiator and co-organizer of an international conference, "Stefan Zweig - ein jüdischer Schrifsteller aus Europa" which took place at the Stefan Zweig Centre in Salzburg in 2015. The papers delivered at this conference (co-edited by Gelber) were published in 2017 in the Stefan Zweig Centre's book series and entitled: "Stefan Zweig - Jüdische Relationen. Studien zu Werk und Biographie". His own essay in this volume argues for the understanding of a "Fourth Life" in the career of Stefan Zweig and includes an analysis from this perspective of Zweig's book on Brazil ("Brasilien. Ein Land der Zukunft") in relation to his famous autobiography, "Die Welt von Gestern." In November 2016 Gelber lectured in Hebrew at a major event in memory of Zweig, organized by the National Library of Israel entitled: Stefan Zweig, the Future, and the Literary World between the World Wars. Also, Gelber contributed the entry on "Judentum und jüdische Identität" to the authoritative "Stefan Zweig Handbuch"(De Gruyter, 2018). Gelber has assumed a major role and is a member of the Public Council in the recently established Israeli Association of Friends of Stefan Zweig (2021). In 2022, Gelber lectured on "Stefan Zweig, Sigmund Freud und autobiographisches Schreiben" at the Freud Museum in Vienna.

 Yiddish-German Literary Relations 
Following in the footsteps of one of his mentors, Professor Solomon Liptzin, for whom he edited Identity and Ethos: A Festschrift for Sol Liptzin on the Occasion of His 85th Birthday, Gelber has contributed numerous articles in the field of Yiddish-German literary relations. In this area he has published on Heinrich Heine and Yiddish; Stefan Zweig, Sholem Asch and Yiddish; Stefan Zweig, Yiddish and East European Literature and Culture; on Yiddish lexical items (and multilingualism) in the work of Stefan Zweig, Fanya Heller, and Ruth Klüger. An essay on Rose Ausländer in Jewish Cultural Spaces (including Yiddish and German) of Early Twentieth-Century Eastern Europe (Bukowina), based on a lecture delivered in Wellington, New Zealand, was published in the memorial volume for Petra Ernst in 2020. In his lecture at the International Kafka Conference held in Prague in 2016, "Kafka and Interculturality," Gelber spoke about the literary relationship between one of the major figures in the modern Yiddish revival, Nathan Birnbaum, and Franz Kafka. In the framework of an intercultural investigation, it can be shown that there is much more to this relationship than merely a Yiddish-German (language) connection. See Mark H. Gelber,"Amerikanismus, Jiddisch, Judentum und Interkulturalität," in Steffen Höhne and Manfred Weinberg (Eds.),"Franz Kafka im interkulturellen Kontext"  (Wien, Köln, Weimar: Böhlau 2019), 87-96.

 German-Jewish and Austrian-Jewish Studies 
Gelber has published extensively in the field of German-Jewish Literature and Culture, which he views as a “discipline in its own right.”  In a published essay based on a conference lecture he gave in Tel Aviv in 2004, and entitled “German-Jewish Literature and Culture and the Field of German-Jewish Studies,” he wrote: “This discipline may be discerned between the boundaries of Germanistik on one side and Jewish Studies on the other, although such fields as Exile Studies (and Diaspora Studies) and Holocaust Studies (and Memory Studies), which also emerged from and appear to be tangential to German and Jewish Studies respectively, also border on and derive synergistic intellectual energy from German-Jewish Studies.” Gelber organized a major international conference on “Thirty Years of German-Jewish Literary Cultural Studies,” which took place in Beer Sheva and Jerusalem in 2010. Gelber is the author of numerous academic encyclopedia articles and essays about German-Jewish literature and culture, and German-Jewish writers, including: Max Brod,  Martin Buber, Lion Feuchtwanger, Berthold Feiwel, Iwan Goll, Sammy Gronnemann, Georg Hirschfeld, Leo Kompert, Theodor Lessing, Jakov Lind, Samuel Lublinski, Salomon Hermann Mosenthal, Chaim Noll, Karl Wolfskehl, Arnold Zweig, and others.<ref>These and other entries have been published in: Blackwell Companion to Jewish Culture. Ed. G. Abramson (Oxford: Blackwell, 1990); "The Concept of Diaspora and Exile in German-Jewish Literature and Art" and "The Concept of the Sephardi and the Ashkenazi in German-Jewish and German Anti-Semitic Thought" in Encyclopedia of the Jewish Diaspora: Origins, Experiences, and Culture, Volume 1. Santa Barbara, CA: ABC-CLIO, 2009. 42-48 and 48-52.; A selection of articles and books on the subject of German-Jewish Studies includes: Mark H. Gelber, Hans Otto Horch and Sigurd Paul Scheichl 1996,  Von Franzos zu Canetti. Jüdische Autoren aus Österreich. Neue Studien (Tübingen: Niemeyer), 428 pp.;

Mark H. Gelber 2004  Confrontations/Accommodations: German-Jewish Literary and Cultural Relations from Heine to Wassermann (Tübingen: Niemeyer Verlag). 288 pp.;
	
Mark H. Gelber and Vivian Liska 2007  Theodor Herzl: From Europe to Zion (Tübingen: Niemeyer Verlag), 250 pp.;

Mark H. Gelber, Jakob Hessing and Robert Jütte 2009. "Integration und Ausgrenzung. Studien zur deutsch-jüdischen Literatur- und Kulturgeschichte von der Frühen Neuzeit bis zur Gegenwart" (Tübingen: Niemeyer Verlag, 2009), 552 pp.;

Mark H. Gelber 2003  "Internationalismus in der deutsch-jüdischen Literatur: Glückel Hameln, Georg Hermann, Julius Bab, und das Yale Handbuch," in Frank Stern and Maria Gerlinger (Eds.), "Die deutsch-jüdische Erfahrung. Beiträge zum kulturellen Dialog" (Berlin: Aufbau Verlag), 69-84.;

Mark H. Gelber 2008, “German-Jewish Literature and Culture and the
Field of German-Jewish Studies,” in Richard Cohen and Jeremy Cohen (Eds.) Jewish “Contributions” to Civilization'' (London: Littman Library), 158-175.;

Mark H. Gelber 2011, "Wieso gibt es eigentlich keine Germanistik in Israel?" in Christian Kohlross und Hanni Mittelman (hg.), "Auf den Spuren der Schrift" (Tübingen: Niemeyer, 2011), 19-30.

Mark H. Gelber 2022, "Ruth Klüger, Judaism and Zionism: An American Perspective," in Gelber (Ed.) The Legacy of Ruth Klüger and the End of the Auschwitz Century (Berlin: De Gruyter, 2022), 89-111.

Mark H. Gelber (Ed.) 2022, "The Legacy of Ruth Klüger and the End of the Auschwitz Century" (Berlin: De Gruyter, 190 pp.).

References

External links 
 Link to Mark H. Gelber's page on the BGU Department of Foreign Literatures and Linguistics website
 Link to Mark H. Gelber's page on the BGU Center for Austrian and German Studies website

Jewish scholars
1951 births
American expatriate academics
Jewish American writers
Jewish philosophers
Academic staff of Ben-Gurion University of the Negev
Living people
Wesleyan University alumni
21st-century American Jews